Göytəpə is a village in the Agdam District of Azerbaijan.

History
The village was occupied by Armenian forces during the First Nagorno-Karabakh war and was administrated as part of Martakert Province of the self-proclaimed Republic of Artsakh by the name . The village was returned to Azerbaijan on 20 November 2020 per the 2020 Nagorno-Karabakh ceasefire agreement.

References 

Populated places in Aghdam District